A Snow Fairy Tale is a 1959 Soviet fantasy film directed by Aleksei Sakharov and Eldar Shengelaia.

Plot 
The film takes place before the New Year. The film tells about a boy-dreamer named Mitya, who is trying to convince his friends that his clock have an amazing ability to stop time and can revive a snow woman. Classmates do not believe Mitya, but suddenly his fantasies become reality.

Cast 
 Igor Yershov as Mitya (voiced by Margarita Korabelnikova)
 Alla Kozhokina as Lyolya (voiced by Margarita Korabelnikova)
Yevgeny Leonov as Old Year
Zinaida Naryshkina as Paper Soul
 Klara Luchko as Black Soul
 Vera Altayskaya as Sale Soul
 Nikolai Sergeyev as Petushkov the Time Master
 Mikhail Pugovkin as chauffeur (voiced by Yuri Sarantsev)

References

External links 
 
 

1959 films
Films set around New Year
Mosfilm films
1950s Russian-language films
Soviet fantasy films
1950s fantasy films
Films directed by Eldar Shengelaia